The Gastonia Pirates were a minor league baseball team, based in Gastonia, North Carolina, between 1959 and 1972. The club was a Class-A affiliate of the Pittsburgh Pirates and played primarily in the Western Carolinas League. The club was originally named the Columbus Pirates prior to 1959 and were based in Columbus, Georgia, as a member of the South Atlantic League. On July 6, 1959 the Pirates moved to Gastonia and became the Gastonia Pirates. In 1960 the Pirates were not an affiliate of the Gastonia team and the void was filled by the Gastonia Rippers in the Western Carolinas League.

After the Pirates folded after the 1972 season, the Gastonia Rangers, an affiliate of the Texas Rangers became the city's representative in the Western Carolinas League.

Season-by-season

* Columbus Pirates moved to Gastonia on July 6, 1959

Notable alumni

Tony Armas (1972) 2 x MLB All-Star
 Dave Cash (1967) 3 x MLB All-Star
 Bob Moose (1966)
 Omar Moreno (1972) 2 x NL Stolen Base Leader (1978-1979)
 Al Oliver (1965) 7 x MLB All-Star; 1982 AL Batting Title
 Freddie Patek (1966) 3 x MLB All-Star
 Craig Reynolds (1972) 2 x MLB All-Star
 Bob Robertson (1965)
 Rennie Stennett (1969)
 Frank Taveras (1969-1970) 1977 NL Stolen Base Leader
 Milt May (1969)
 Richie Zisk (1968) 2 x MLB All-Star

References

Defunct minor league baseball teams
Defunct Western Carolinas League teams
South Atlantic League (1904–1963) teams
Pittsburgh Pirates minor league affiliates
Professional baseball teams in North Carolina
1959 establishments in North Carolina
1972 disestablishments in North Carolina
Defunct South Atlantic League teams
Gastonia, North Carolina